This is a list of the managers of the Nigeria women's national football team, starting from the first international game in 1991 till date.

The position of head coach currently is vacant. The Nigeria Football Federation has said the next coach will be a foreigner.

Manager history

References 

Nigeria